Nasirabad (also Romanized as Naşīrābād; also known as Nasr-Abad) is a village in Ozomdel-e Jonubi Rural District, in the Central District of Varzaqan County, East Azerbaijan Province, Iran. At the 2006 census, its population was 41, in 10 families.

References 

Towns and villages in Varzaqan County